Lidia Brito is a Mozambiquan forestry expert and engineer and university lecturer, researcher and consultant for Eduardo Mondlane University.

Brito holds an undergraduate degree in Forest Engineering by Eduardo Mondlane University (Mozambique) and received M.Sc. and Ph.D. degrees in Forest Sciences from Colorado State University (USA). She served as the first Minister of Higher Education, Science and Technology of Mozambique (2000–2005) and was Deputy Vice-Chancellor of Eduardo Mondlane University (1998–2000). More recently, Brito has served as Advisor of the Mayor of Maputo for Strategic Planning and External Relations in the capital of Maputo. Internationally, she is a recognized academic promoting sustainable development, and community–based management in Africa in general, and is a member of  IHE-UNESCO Governing Board since December 2009. Brito is the director of science policy and capacity building at UNESCO and a co-chairman of the conference, titled Planet Under Pressure.

She is also an active participant and speaker in many international summits and conferences.

References

Living people
Year of birth missing (living people)
Mozambican engineers
Mozambican ecologists
Government ministers of Mozambique
Women government ministers of Mozambique
Colorado State University alumni
21st-century Mozambican women politicians
21st-century Mozambican politicians